Vicovu de Sus is a town in northern Suceava County, on the border with Ukraine. It is situated in the historical region of Bukovina. The town administers one village, Bivolărie.

History
It was bought by Ștefan cel Mare for Putna Monastery in the year 1466. The locality, previously a rural commune, received town status in 2004.

Natives
Daniil Sihastrul
Gherasim Clipa
Ion Nistor
Aurel Onciul

Demographics 

According to the 2011 census, there was a total population of 13,053 people living in the town. Of this population, 94.7% were ethnic Romanians and 5% ethnic Romani. 76.7% were Romanian Orthodox, 20.9% Pentecostal, and 2% Baptist.

References

Populated places in Suceava County
Towns in Romania
Localities in Southern Bukovina
Duchy of Bukovina